Hatna is a village in the southern state of Karnataka, India, located in the Mandya district.

Villages in Mandya district